Sept-Îles (Quebec French pronunciation : , French for "Seven Islands") is a city in the Côte-Nord region of eastern Quebec. It is among the northernmost locales with a paved connection to the rest of Quebec's road network. The population was 25,686 as of the 2011 Canadian census. The town is called Uashat, meaning "bay" in Innu-aimun.

The city is well known for having major iron companies like Iron Ore Company of Canada and the Cleveland-Cliffs mining company. The city relies heavily on the iron industry. Sept-Îles has among the highest average wages and the highest average wage increases.

The only settlements on the paved road network that are farther north are Fermont, Radisson and Chisasibi, the latter two of which are in the extreme western part of the province at the north end of the James Bay Road. The only other settlements at higher latitudes in the province are mostly isolated Cree, Innu, or Inuit villages, with access limited to seasonal gravel roads.

Sept-Îles is the seat of the judicial district of Mingan. The city is also home to the most highly-attended recreational volleyball tournament in the province: the Tournoi Orange, which consists of 405 teams and close to 800 volleyball games.

History and economy 

The first inhabitants of the area were varying cultures of aboriginal peoples. The historic Montagnais or Innu people, who called it Uashat ("Great Bay"), lived there at the time of European encounter. Jacques Cartier sailed by the islands in 1535 and made the first written record of them, calling them the Ysles Rondes ("Round Islands"). He was not the first European in the area, as he encountered Basque fishermen who came annually from Europe for whaling and cod fishing.

Early European economic activity in Sept-Îles was based on fishing and the fur trade. Louis Joliet established trading posts by 1679. Great Britain took over Canada from France in 1763 after its victory in the Seven Years' War. In 1842 the Hudson's Bay Company founded another post at this location. The village was incorporated into a municipality in 1885.

Lacking road access at the time, the town got its first pier in 1908. The City of Sept-Îles was incorporated in 1951, on the 300th anniversary of the first Catholic Mass held in the village.

The modern Sept-Îles was built rapidly during the construction of the Quebec North Shore and Labrador Railway, the  railway link to the northern town of Schefferville. The railway was built between 1950 and 1954 by the Iron Ore Company of Canada. Iron ore mined near Schefferville and Wabush, Labrador, was transported on this railway and shipped from the Port of Sept-Îles. Shipment of the important new commodity resulted in investments that turned this into a major port.

With the iron ore business, the Sept-Îles deep-water seaport was second in Canada only to Vancouver in terms of yearly tonnage. The huge engineering project led to a major increase in population, and housing was quickly built to accommodate them. The town grew from 2,000 inhabitants in 1951 to 14,000 in 1961, and 31,000 in 1981. The decline in worldwide iron ore prices in recent decades has since caused employment and population to decrease.

During the early 1990s, some new jobs accompanied the construction and operation of the new Aluminerie Alouette inc. aluminum processing plant. Construction for Phase 1 began in September 1989, and operation started in 1992. Construction of Phase 2 began in 2003.

In 2002 the city amalgamated with the communities of Gallix and Moisie. The city includes the neighbourhoods of Arnaud, Clarke-City, De Grasse, de la Pointe, de la Rivière, Ferland, La Boule, Lac Labrie, Matamec, Plages, Pointe-Noire and Val-Marguerite.

Transportation
The Sept-Îles Airport has connections all over Quebec and Labrador. General aviation seaplanes are served by Sept-Îles/Lac Rapides Water Aerodrome. Air Gaspé was based in Sept-Îles, but acquired by Quebecair in 1973. In the 1980s, continued airline restructuring led to Quebecair's being acquired by CP Air in 1986, which in turn was taken over by Canadian Airlines in 1987.

Tshiuetin Rail Transportation also operates a passenger rail service north to Emeril, Labrador (near Labrador City) which continues northward towards its terminus in Schefferville, Quebec.

Groupe Desgagnés operates the Bella Desgagnés passenger and cargo ship along the lower St. Lawrence from Rimouski to Blanc-Sablon from mid-April to mid-January.

Geography 
Located on the north shore of the Saint Lawrence River, between the Sainte-Marguerite and Moisie rivers, Sept-Îles lies on the shore of a deep-water bay fronted by a seven-island archipelago, about 230 kilometres east of Baie-Comeau. The bay constitutes a 45 km2 natural harbour.

The seven islands are named:
 La Grosse Boule ("the big ball")
 La Petite Boule ("the small ball")
 La Grande Basque ("the large Basque", named after the visiting Basque fishermen)
 La Petite Basque ("the small Basque")
 Île Manowin (from the Montagnais manouane meaning "where eggs are picked")
 Île du Corossol (named after the French ship Corossol wrecked on the island in 1693; site of a lighthouse and a bird sanctuary)
 Îlets Dequen (a group of tiny islands named after Jean de Quen who founded the local Catholic mission in 1650)

The archipelago is under provincial jurisdiction, with some parts administered by the federal government or by individuals.

There are two First Nations reserves in the area: Uashat in the western city proper, and Maliotenam in the east near the Moisie River.

Climate

Sept-Îles has a subarctic climate (Köppen climate classification Dfc) bordering on a humid continental climate (Dfb) despite being located at around only 50 degrees latitude. The two main seasons are summer and winter, as spring and autumn are very short transition seasons lasting only a few weeks. Precipitation is significant year-round, but it is lowest from January to March.

The coldest temperature was recorded at Clarke City, which was the primary weather station for the area until records began at Sept-Îles Airport in September 1944.

Demographics 

At the Census Agglomeration level in the 2021 census, the agglomeration of Sept-Îles had a population of 27,729 living in12,293 of its 13,878 total private dwellings, a change of -2.8% from its 2016 population of 28,534. With a land area of 1,750.44 km2 (675.85 sq mi), it had a population density of 15.8/km2 (40.76/sq mi) in 2021.

The ville of Sept-Îles had a 2021 population of 24,569. The median age was 42.8, as opposed to 41.6 for all of Canada. French was the mother tongue of 84.8% of residents in 2021. The next most common mother tongues were Innu at 8.3%, followed by English at 2.6%. 1.0% reported both English and French as their first language. Additionally there were 1.7% who reported both French and a non-official language as their mother tongue, mostly those speaking Innu.

As of 2021, Indigenous peoples comprised 18.4% of the population, mostly First Nations, and visible minorities contributed 2.1%. The largest visible minority groups in Sept-Îles are Black (0.8%), Filipino (0.4%), and Latin American (0.3%). The area is home to 170 recent immigrants (i.e. those arriving between 2016 and 2021), who comprise about 0.7% of the total population. 105 of them come from various African countries.

In 2021, 70.2% of the population identified as Catholic, a 18.8% decrease from 2011, while 22.0% said they had no religious affiliation. Muslims were the largest religious minority, making up 0.7% of the population. In 2011, the Institution de la Statistique du Québec reported that, with a population of 25,530 inhabitants, Sept-Îles' population was 95.7% francophone, 2.3% anglophone and 2% allophone (usually speaking Innu). Also in 2011, Statistics Canada reported that, with a population of 28,487 people, 86.2% of the Sept-Îles population cited French only as their mother tongue, 10.3% reported only a native or non-official language, and 2.7% reported English only.

Tourism

Since 2009, Sept-Îles has been part of the Saint-Laurent destination circuit, which has nine international cruise ports. On a larger scale, an alliance is being created with other ports in northeastern America and Canada under the auspices of Canada New England. The international cruises in Sept-Îles are led by the non-profit organization Destination Sept-Îles Nakauinanu.M The organization's mission is to enable the various public and private bodies to enjoy a permanent structure, in the form of a one-stop shop, enabling them to work jointly on the development and promotion of the City of Sept-Îles and from its surroundings to international cruise lines. The main partners involved in the development of international cruises are the city of Sept-Îles, the Port of Sept-Îles, the and Innu Takuaikan Uashat Mak Mani-Utenam.

As of 2018, more than 55,000 international visitors have visited the port of call. Cunard, P & O Cruises, Cruise and Maritime Voyages, Phoenix Reisen, Holland America Line, Oceania Cruises, Regent Seven Seas, Silversea, Saga Cruises, Crystal Cruises, Norwegian Cruise Line, Pearl Seas Cruises and Transocean Tours are among the clients of the port. On September 7, 2019, when Royal Caribbean Line made its maiden call overnight, this was a safe haven for avoiding Hurricane Dorian.

Media

Radio
 FM 90.1 - CKAU-FM-1, First Nations community radio (rebroadcasts CKAU-FM Maliotenam)
 FM 94.1 - CKCN-FM, contemporary hit radio
 FM 96.1 - CBRX-FM-2, Ici Musique (rebroadcasts CBRX-FM Rimouski)
 FM 96.9 - CBSE-FM, CBC Radio One (rebroadcasts CBVE-FM Quebec City)
 FM 98.1 - CBSI-FM, Ici Radio-Canada Première
 FM 99.1 - CIPC-FM, soft rock

Television
All terrestrial television stations in the Sept-Îles area are repeaters of stations and networks that originate elsewhere. These stations are available on the Cogeco cable system, which also offer a local cable channel, TVCogeco. The local Cogeco system also carries CBMT-DT (CBC) Montreal and CJBR-DT (Ici Radio-Canada Télé) Rimouski.

Sept-Îles is not designated as a mandatory market for digital television conversion; only CFTF-TV and Télé-Québec announced their intentions to convert all their transmitters to digital, regardless of location.
 Channel 5 / DT 20 - CFER-TV-2, TVA (rebroadcasts CFER-TV Rimouski)
 Channel 7 / PSIP 7 - CFTF-DT-7, V (rebroadcasts CFTF-DT Rivière-du-Loup)
 Channel 9 / PSIP 9 - CIVG-DT, Télé-Québec (rebroadcasts CIVM-DT Montreal)

Economy
Iron ore concentrate from IOC activities in Labrador City are transported by the Quebec North Shore and Labrador Railway and are shipped to many markets around the world from Sept-Îles port facilities. Iron ore from Wabush and Bloom Lake is also shipped at Point Noire port facilities. The Aluminerie Alouette, in activity since 1992, has a large part in the local employment since construction started in 1989. Since its major expansion that started in 2005, it is now the largest primary aluminum smelter in the Americas. As a service centre for northeastern Québec, Sept-Îles economy is also powered by many jobs in the services sector.

Prior to its disestablishment, Air Gaspé was headquartered in Sept-Îles.

Notable people
 Denis Thériault, author, playwright and screenwriter.
 Guy Carbonneau, Hall of Fame, former NHL defensive forward, former coach with the Montreal Canadiens
 Karen Cliche, actress
 Louis Jolliet, bought some land and the fur trading post.
 Louis-Jean Cormier, vocalist and guitarist of the band Karkwa
 Steve Duchesne, former NHL defenceman
 Karl Dykhuis, former NHL defenceman
 Guillaume LeBlanc, Olympic silver medalist in walking
 Claude McKenzie, singer-songwriter and member of the group Kashtin
 Bruno Pauletto, physiologist, athlete, businessman, coach, author
 Henry de Puyjalon, (1841-1905) scientist, pioneer in ecology 
 Myriam Sirois, actress
 Robert Michael Ballantyne, former-explorer who traded furs 
 Florent Vollant, singer-songwriter and member of the group Kashtin
 Rob Zettler, former NHL defenceman
 Margot Kidder, was born in 1948 as "a Stanton baby". Throughout her childhood, she moved to a number of Canadian towns, including Labrador City, N.L., Beloeil, Que., and Sept-Îles, Que.
 Pierre Bourgault, Political activist and pioneer of the Quebec separatist movement tried to be elected in the Sept-Îles provincial district (Duplessis)
 Pierre Duchesne, ex-Lieutenant Governor of Quebec did his notary career in Sept-Îles

See also 
 COGEMA

Notes and references

 Dredge, L. A. Surficial Geology of the Sept-Îles Area, Quebec North Shore. Ottawa, Canada: Geological Survey of Canada, 1983.
 Faessler, Carl. Sept-Îles Area, North Shore of St. Lawrence, Saguenay County. Québec: Dept. of Mines, Division of Geological Surveys, 1942.

External links

  Ville de Sept-Îles

 
Cities and towns in Quebec
Quebec populated places on the Saint Lawrence River
Hudson's Bay Company trading posts
Port settlements in Quebec